Gualberto Luís da Silva Júnior or simply Gualberto (born April 8, 1990 in Campinas), is a Brazilian centre back. He currently plays for Paysandu, on loan from Penapolense.

Career
Gualberto made his debut for Palmeiras as a second-half substitute in a Campeonato Paulista 2010 match against Mogi Mirim on 16 January 2010.

References

1990 births
Living people
Brazilian footballers
Sociedade Esportiva Palmeiras players
ABC Futebol Clube players
América Futebol Clube (MG) players
Criciúma Esporte Clube players
Association football defenders
Sportspeople from Campinas